Lester Martin Schulman (born September 3, 1934), who writes as Les Martin, is a US writer of speculative fiction media tie-ins, particularly within the Blade Runner, Frankenstein, Indiana Jones, and The X-Files fiction series.

Schulman received a BA from Antioch College in 1955. He was an editor for Popular Library (1963-1965), Bantam Books (1966-1967), and Dell Publishing from 1969.

Select bibliography

Indiana Jones
 Indiana Jones and the Temple of Doom (1984) - Young Adult Novelization of the 1984 film.
 Indiana Jones and the Last Crusade (1989) - Young Adult Novelization of the 1989 film.

Young Indiana Jones
Young adult novels set in the Young Indiana Jones universe.
 Young Indiana Jones and the Tomb of Terror (1990)
 Young Indiana Jones and the Secret City (1990)
 Young Indiana Jones and the Princess of Peril (1991)
 Young Indiana Jones and the Gypsy Revenge (1991)
 Field of Death (1992)
 Trek of Doom (1992)
 Prisoner of War (1993)
 Young Indiana Jones and the Titanic Adventure (1993)

X-Files
 X Marks the Spot (1995) - Novelization of the X-Files pilot episode from 1993.
 Darkness Falls (1995) - Novelization of the first season X-Files episode Darkness Falls from 1994.
 Tiger, Tiger (1996) - Novelization of the second season X-Files episode Fearful Symmetry from 1995.
 Humbug (1996) - Novelization of the second season X-Files episode Humbug from 1995.
 Fear (1996) - Novelization of the second season X-Files episode Blood from 1994.
 E. B. E. (1996) - Novelization of the first season X-Files episode E.B.E. from 1994.
 Die, Bug, Die! (1997) - Novelization of the third season X-Files episode War of the Coprophages from 1996.
 Ghost in the Machine - Novelization of the first season X-Files episode Ghost in the Machine from 1993.
 Fresh Bones (1997) - Novelization of the second season X-Files episode Fresh Bones from 1995.
 The Host (1997) - Novelization of the second season X-Files episode The Host from 1994.
 Quarantine (1999) - Novelization of the second season X-Files episode F. Emasculata from 1995.

Other novelizations
 Blade Runner (1982) - Photo-illustrated novelization based on the screenplay for the 1982 film.
 The Bride: A Tale of Love and Doom (1985) - Novelization of the 1985 film The Bride.
 The Shadow (1994) - Novelization of the 1994 film.

Anthologies
All anthologies were edited under the name L. M. Schulman:
 Come Out the Wilderness (1965)
 Winners and Losers; An Anthology of Great Sports Fiction (1968)
 The Loners: Short Stories About the Young and Alienated (1970)
 The Cracked Looking Glass: Stories of Other Realities (1971)
 Travelers: Stories of Americans Abroad (1972)
 A Woman's Place: An Anthology of Short Stories (1974)
 Autumn Light: Illuminations of Age" (1978)
 The Random House of Sports Stories (1990), illustrated by Thomas B. Allen
 Shakespeare's Life and World'' (2016), with Katherine Duncan-Jones

References

External links

Living people
1934 births